NOAAS Oscar Dyson (R 224) is an American fisheries and oceanographic research vessel in commission in the National Oceanic and Atmospheric Administration (NOAA) fleet since 2005.

Construction and commissioning 

Oscar Dyson was built by VT Halter Marine at Moss Point, Mississippi, and was launched on 17 October 2003, sponsored by Peggy Dyson-Malson, a ship-to-shore weather broadcaster for the National Weather Service in Kodiak, Alaska, from 1974 and 1999 and the widow of the ship's namesake, Alaskan fisherman and fishing industry leader Oscar E. Dyson. Delivered to NOAA on 1 August 2004, the ship eventually proceeded to Kodiak, Dysons home town, where she was commissioned into service as NOAAS Oscar Dyson (R 224) on 28 May 2005.

Characteristics and capabilities 

Capable of conducting multidisciplinary oceanographic operations in support of biological, chemical, and physical process studies, Oscar Dyson was commissioned as the first of a class of five of the most advanced fisheries research vessels in the world, with a unique capability to conduct both fishing and oceanographic research. She is a stern trawler with fishing capabilities similar to those of commercial fishing vessels. Her most advanced feature is the incorporation of acoustic quieting technology to enable NOAA scientists to monitor fish populations without the ships noise altering the behavior of the fish. Her oceanographic hydrophones are mounted on a retractable centerboard, or drop keel, that lowers scientific transducers away from the region of hull-generated flow noise, enhancing the quality of the data collected. To take full advantage of these advanced data-gathering capabilities, she has the Scientific Sonar System, which can accurately measure the biomass of fish in a survey area. She also has an Acoustic Doppler Current Profiler with which to collect data on ocean currents and a multibeam sonar system that provides information on the content of the water column and on the type and topography of the seafloor while she is underway, and she can gather hydrographic data at any speed up to 11 knots (20 km/hr).

She also has two hydrographic winches, each of which can deploy  of 9.5-mm (3/8-inch) EM cable, two trawl winches, each of which can deploy  of cable, and a Gilson winch. The oceanographic winch and large after A-frame work in conjunction to serve her stern sampling station, while the two hydrographic winches work with the side A-frame to service her side sampling station, and the two hydrographic winches together give Oscar Dyson the capability to have two scientific packages ready for sequential operations. In addition to trawling, her sampling stations can deploy smaller sampling nets, longlines, and fish traps. The hydrographic winches can deploy CTD instruments to measure the electrical conductivity, temperature, and chlorophyll fluorescence of sea water. Oscar Dyson also can deploy specialized gear such as Multiple Opening/Closing Net and Environmental Sensing System (MOCNESS) frames, towed vehicles, dredges, and bottom corers, and she can deploy and recover both floating and bottom-moored sensor arrays.

Oscar Dyson has various laboratory capabilities. A wet laboratory, a dry laboratory, a biology laboratory, and a hydrographic laboratory all are situated on the starboard side of her main deck, while an electronics and computer laboratory are on the port side of her main deck. Her wet laboratory includes a climate-controlled space with a built-in chiler system.

Oscar Dyson carries two boats. Her  survey launch has a 260-horsepower (194-kW) motor and can accommodate up to eight people. Her  rescue boat has a 256-horsepower (191-kW) motor and can carry up to six people.

Designed for operations in Alaskan waters, Oscar Dyson has an ice-strengthened welded-steel hull. In addition to her crew of 24, she can accommodate up to 15 scientists.

Service history 

Operated by NOAAs Office of Marine and Aviation Operations and with Kodiak as her home port, Oscar Dysons primary purpose is to support NOAA's mission of protecting, restoring, and managing the use of living marine, coastal, and ocean resources. She conducts projects for NOAA's Alaska Fisheries Science Center and the Pacific Marine Environmental Laboratory, studying and monitoring Alaskan pollock and other fisheries in the Bering Sea and Gulf of Alaska. She makes weather and sea state observations, conducts oceanographic research and habitat assessments, and surveys marine mammal and seabird populations.

In 2007 and 2008, Oscar Dyson took scientists to the Bering Sea so that they could capture seals on the ice there and attach satellite tags to them with which to collect movement and behavior data. To expand NOAA's ability to monitor ribbon, bearded, spotted, and ringed seals, whose broad range and remoteness from shore make surveying them using manned helicopters challenging, NOAA conducted tests of the ScanEagle unmanned aerial vehicle (UAV) aboard Oscar Dyson in October 2008. On 15 and 16 October 2008, scientists and technicians aboard Oscar Dyson conducted three successful test flights of the ScanEagle over Puget Sound, Washington, launching it from a pneumatic catapult attached to the top of her bridge, flying it by remote control from Oscar Dyson, and recovering it with a "skyhook" system – a vertical line deployed over Oscar Dysons starboard side between a winch and a boom – that the ScanEagle could grab with hooks on its wingtips as it returned to the ship. As a United States Coast Guard officer aboard Oscar Dyson to study the feasibility of using the ScanEagle for search and rescue missions looked on, Oscar Dysons bridge personnel and the embarked UAV pilots cooperated closely to ensure that the ships speed and heading facilitated the launch and recovery of the aircraft. The test demonstrated the feasibility of using UAVs to assess the abundance and distribution of seals, which began in the spring of 2009.

On 30 April and 1 May 2017, Oscar Dyson surveyed an area in the Bering Sea off Dalnoi Point on the northwestern tip of St. George Island in the Pribilof Islands in a search for the wreck of the  crab-fishing boat Destination, which had capsized and sunk in the area with the loss of her entire crew of six men on 11 February 2017.

See also
 NOAA ships and aircraft

References

External links

 noaa.gov NOAA Ship Oscar Dyson: Oscar Dyson
 noaa.gov NOAA Ship Oscar Dyson: Peggy Dyson-Malson

Ships of the National Oceanic and Atmospheric Administration
Ships built in Moss Point, Mississippi
2003 ships